The Socrates Network for Translator Training (SNTT) is a group of EU universities created in 1990 which provides training for professional translators and interpreters. Its aim is to widen skills and competences through different exchange programmes which offer various courses related to translation and joint research projects.

This structured network of academic and professional experience allows students and teaching staff mobility at all levels of university training (BA, MA, PhD).
The network is part of the Erasmus Programme and represents a new approach to cooperation and knowledge sharing.

Members 
The university members of SNTT all have a Translation and/or Interpretation department and are located in 14 different countries. All members meet regularly to highlight main problems and achievements, in order to continually improve the programme.

Funding 
Since 1997 all universities are bound by a contract with the European Commission which regulates the distribution of funds.

External links 
 Erasmus programme
 SNTT members

Organizations established in 1990
Translation organizations